The Ministry of Internal Affairs is a department of the Albanian Government, in charge of regulation for the protection of rights and liberties of Albanian citizens. Collaborating with the State Police, the ministry investigates unlawful acts against the interest of society and state, fights crime, provides civil order, ensures civil security, traffic safety, and protects the security and protection of important individuals.

Reorganization
Since the establishment of the institution, the Ministry of Internal Affairs has undergone several administrative changes to its organizational structure. When a new department was formed, it often merged with the ministry thus expanding its role, subsequently leading to the name of the ministry being changed. If that department later broke off as a separate ministry or was dissolved, the ministry reverted to its original name.

 Ministry of Internal Affairs (1912–1914; 1927–1939; 1943–1991; 2013–2017)
 Ministry of Internal Affairs and War (1914–1925)
 Ministry of Internal Affairs and Public Works (1925–1927)
 Minister State Secretary for Internal Affairs (1939–1943)
 Ministry of Public Order (1991–1994; 1998–2005)
 Ministry of Interior (1994–1998; 2005–2013; 2017–present)

Subordinate institutions
 State Police
 Republican Guard
 National Inspectorate of Territorial Defence
 Agency of Police Supervision
 Agency for the Administration of Seized and Confiscated Assets 
 Administration Center of Transportation Services
 Recreation Center, Durrës
 Reception Center for Asylum Seekers

Officeholders (1912–present)

Notes

See also 
Albanian Police

References

Internal
Albania
Albania
1912 establishments in Albania